L'armoire de fer (French: 'iron chest') in general refers to an iron chest used to house important papers. A notable and frequent use of the term refers to a hiding place at the apartments of Louis XVI of France at the Tuileries Palace where some secret documents were kept. The existence of this iron cabinet, hidden behind wooden panelling, was publicly revealed in November 1792 to Roland, Girondin Minister of the Interior.

History

A locksmith by the name of François Gamain helped reveal these documents to the authorities, who rewarded him with a government pension. The cabinet hid correspondence between Louis XVI and, among others, Mirabeau, whose venality and duplicity were exposed. Also, the cabinet included the correspondence of the king with the financier Maximilien Radix de Sainte-Foix, an important secret advisor of the sovereign; with the bankers Joseph Duruey, and Tourteau de Septeuil; with Arnaud Laporte, a Royalist government minister who controlled large funds of money during the revolution; with François de Bonal, Bishop of Clermont, et al.

Most of the pieces of correspondence in the cabinet involved ministers of Louis XVI (Montmorin, Valdec Lessart, Bertrand de Molleville, Count of Narbonne, Cahier de Gerville, Charles François Dumouriez, et al.).

Other letters involved prominent figures of the Revolution, such as General Santerre, Lafayette, Antoine Rivarol, and Talleyrand. There were rumors that only selected documents were made public, and that certain other documents were destroyed. The Interior Minister Roland would have played a role in this regard, and may have destroyed documents involving his colleague Danton.

Aftermath
After the discovery of the armoire de fer, Mirabeau's remains were removed from the Pantheon. On 20 November 1792, Jean-Marie Roland filed these archives—at least what was left of them (which was considerable)—with the office of the National Convention, negating all maneuvers to prevent putting Louis XVI on trial. By the order of the Convention of 6 December 1792, many of these documents were published by the national printing office in 1792–1793.

Notes

This article is based on French Wikipedia.

References
 Andrew Freeman, The Compromising of Louis XVI : the armoire de fer and the French Revolution, University of Exeter Press, collection "Exeter studies in history", 1989.
 Olivier Blanc, La corruption sous la Terreur, Paris, Robert Laffont, collection "Les hommes et l'histoire", 1992.
 Paul and Pierrette Girault de Coursac, Enquête sur le procès du Roi Louis XVI, La Table Ronde, 1982. Réédition : F.X. de Guibert, 1992.

External links
An alternative version (French) This is a version of the story by Louis XVI's defenders—based on the work of Girault de Coursac—that claims that the 'iron chest' didn't even exist.

1792 events of the French Revolution
French Revolution